Hunt to Kill is a 2010 Canadian-American direct-to-video action film starring Steve Austin, Gil Bellows, and Eric Roberts.

Plot 
The film begins with border patrol agent Jim Rhodes and his partner Lee exploring a seemingly abandoned trailer in Texas. Prior to entering the trailer Lee gives Jim a watch made from climbing rope that can be used as emergency gear. They find a meth lab and are promptly attacked by men who shoot Lee and set the trailer on fire. Lee dies and Jim is forced to flee the trailer before it explodes. 

Some time later, a group of men have stolen millions of dollars in bearer bonds from the Hotel Palacio casino in Reno. They regroup in a warehouse where the bonds are stolen by one of the group, Lawson. The other thieves, led by Lawson's right-hand man Banks, manage to track Lawson to Lowery, Montana, where Jim now lives with his rebellious daughter Kim. He's called in to pick her up from the Sherriff's office after she was caught shoplifting, only to discover Banks beating and killing the Sherriff. They force Jim to help them traverse the wilderness and find Lawson, threatening to kill Kim if he refuses. He agrees and the group sets out into the mountains. The thieves manage to catch up to Lawson, who they kill after taking back the money. Assuming that Kim can serve as their guide, they push Jim off a cliff. 

Now angrier than before, Jim survives and hunts the thieves, picking them off one by one until only Banks is left. Banks flees to an outpost manned by three Canadian cops. He murders the cops and flees in one of their ATVs, leaving Kim behind. Jim arrives on the scene and takes one of the remaining ATVs to chase after Banks, telling Kim to use the other to get help. He catches up to Banks in an abandoned factory and the two men battle, culminating in Jim killing Banks by pinning him to a wall with an ATV and causing an explosion with a flare gun. The film ends with Jim and Kim safe, but realizing that they must now walk home as the other ATVs were destroyed.

Cast
Steve Austin as agent Jim Rhodes
Marie Avgeropoulos as Kim Rhodes
Gil Bellows as Banks
Gary Daniels as Jensen
Michael Eklund as Geary
Eric Roberts as agent Lee Davis
Michael Hogan as Lawson
Adrian Holmes as Crab
Emilie Ullerup as Dominika

Production
Hunt to Kill began filming during December 2009 in Vancouver, British Columbia, Canada. Steve Austin was confirmed as the film's protagonist, Jim Rhodes, and he acted alongside Gary Daniels, and Eric Roberts. The trio had worked together for the 2010 action film The Expendables and Austin personally selected them for Hunt to Kill.  Austin stated that he felt "really in my element" while filming the wilderness scenes and that he could relate to his character as both he and the character of Rhodes had spent a lot of time away from their families due to work. He received the script while filming another movie in Vancouver and Austin gave input on script based on his own experience as a hunter in order to "make this a realistic hunt".

Director Keoni Waxman took the directing gig, in part due to his love for the Sydney Poitier/Tom Berenger mountain thriller Shoot to Kill. He was initially tentative about doing a similar film, but when he learned that avid outdoorsman Austin would be involved, he became confident that they could put their own stamp on the concept. 
Waxman was set to direct Born to Raise Hell with Steven Seagal, but instead had his regular stunt coordinator and second unit director Lauro Chartrand replace him on that picture.

Release 
Hunt to Kill was released direct to video in the United States on November 9, 2010 through Anchor Bay Entertainment.

Reception
Critical reception has been predominantly negative. Common Sense Media rated the film 2 out of 5 stars. Mike Barnard of Future Movies UK said, "There’s nothing much to see here unless you’re an ardent Stone Cold fan." Dread Central rated the film 2/5, criticizing its pacing.

References

External links
 
 

2010s Canadian films
2010s American films
2010s English-language films
2010 action films
2010 direct-to-video films
2010 films
Canadian action films
Canadian direct-to-video films
American action films
American direct-to-video films
English-language Canadian films
Films shot in Vancouver
Films directed by Keoni Waxman